Phenyl phosphorodiamidate is an organophosphorus compound with the formula C6H5OP(O)(NH2)2.  A white solid, it is used as an inhibitor of urease, an enzyme that accelerates the hydrolysis of urea. In this way, phenyl phosphorodiamidate enhances the effectiveness of urea-based fertilizers.  It is a component of the technology of controlled release fertilizers.

In terms of its molecular structure, phenyl phosphorodiamidate is a tetrahedral molecule structurally related to urea, hence its inhibitory function.  It is a derivative of phosphoryl chloride.

See also
 N-(n-butyl)thiophosphoric triamide, a related urease inhibitor

References

Phosphoramides
Soil improvers
Fertilizers